Don Lang (born Gordon Langhorn; 19 January 1925 – 3 August 1992) was an English trombonist and singer who led Don Lang and his Frantic Five.

Biography
Lang was born in Halifax, England on 19 January 1925. He and his band appeared on Six-Five Special, the first BBC Television show for teenagers, from 1957. In 1958, his cover version of "Witch Doctor" reached the Top 10 of the UK Singles Chart. Lang played trombone on the song "Revolution 1" on The Beatles' 'White Album'. Lang retired in the late 1980s. He died of cancer in London on 3 August 1992, aged 67.

Discography

Albums
 The Complete '50s Singles – 2012 (Peaksoft) (includes HMV POP714 from 1960)

Singles
Don Lang
 HMV POP115: "Cloudburst"/"Seventeen" – 1955, UK No. 16
 HMV POP150: "Four Brothers"/"I Want You to Be My Baby" – 1956
 HMV POP178: "Rock Around the Island"/"Jumpin' to Conclusions" – 1956
 HMV POP224: "Rock and Roll Blues"/"Stop the World I Wanna Get Off" – 1956
 HMV POP260: "Sweet Sue – Just You"/"Lazy Latin" – 1956

Don Lang and his Frantic Five
 Electrola HMV 45-EG 8775: "Red Sputnik Rock (Red Planet Rock)"/"Texas Tambourine" – 1956
 HMV POP289: "Rock Around the Cookhouse"/"Rock Mister Piper"
 HMV POP335: "Rock-a-Billy"/"Come Go with Me"
 HMV POP350: "School Day (Ring! Ring! Goes the Bell)" – 1956, UK No. 26/"Six Five Special"
 HMV POP382: "White Silver Sands"/"Again 'N' Again 'N' Again" - 1957
 HMV POP414: "Red Planet Rock"/"Texas Tambourine" - 1957
 HMV 7EG 8208: "The Big Beat"/"Rock, Rock, Rock"/"Baby Baby"/"Rock Pretty Baby" - 1957
 HMV POP465: "Tequila"/"Junior Hand Jive" - 1957
 HMV POP488: "Witch Doctor" – 1958, UK No. 5/"Cool Baby Cool" - 1958
 HMV POP510: "The Bird On My Head"/"Hey Daddy" - 1958
 HMV POP547: "Queen Of The Hop"/"La-Do-Da-Da" - 1958
 HMV POP585: "Wiggle Wiggle"/Teasin'" - 1959
 HMV POP623: "Percy Green"/Phineas McCoy" - 1959
 HMV POP649: "A Hoot and a Holler"/"See You Friday" - 1959
 HMV POP682: "Reveille Rock"/"Frankie and Johnny" – 1959
 HMV POP714: "Sink the Bismarck"/"They Call Him Cliff" – 1960, UK No. 43
 HMV POP805: "Time Machine"/"Don't Open That Door"

References

External links
Mini biography at 45-rpm.org.uk

1925 births
1992 deaths
20th-century English singers
20th-century trombonists
Deaths from cancer in England
English bandleaders
English jazz trombonists
English male singers
English session musicians
English jazz singers
Male trombonists
Musicians from Yorkshire
RCA Victor artists
20th-century British male singers
British male jazz musicians
People from Halifax, West Yorkshire